State Route 264 (SR 264) is a  northwest-southeast state highway located in the eastern part of the Atlanta metropolitan area in the U.S. state of Georgia. Its route is entirely within Gwinnett County.

Route description
SR 264 begins at an intersection with US 78/SR 10 (Stone Mountain Highway) southwest of Snellville. Here, the roadway continues as Killian Hill Road SW. Just after its western terminus, the route runs along the west side of the Mountain View Village Shopping Center. South of the shopping center is Shiloh Road, which leads to Shiloh Elementary School, Shiloh Middle School, and Shiloh High School. The road curves to the southeast and crosses Jacks Creek. Southeast of that crossing is Centerville Public Library. SR 264 continues to the southeast, until it meets its eastern terminus, an intersection with SR 124 (Centerville Highway) north of Centerville. At its eastern terminus, the roadway continues as Zoar Road SW. The route is known as Bethany Church Road for its entire length.

No section of SR 264 is part of the National Highway System, a system of routes determined to be the most important for the nation's economy, mobility and defense.

History
SR 264 was established in 1949 along the same alignment as it travels today. By 1955, the entire route was paved.

Major intersections

See also

References

External links

264
Transportation in Gwinnett County, Georgia